Modesto, California, is a city in the United States.

Modesto may also refer to:

Places 
Modesto, Illinois, United States small settlement
Modesto, Indiana, United States unincorporated community 
Modesto Omiste Province, Bolivia
Modesto or Modi (Meteora), a rock in Meteora, Greece

People 
Modesto (surname), including a list of people with the surname Modesto